Halat could refer to the following places:

Halat, Iran, a village in Chardaval County, Ilam Province, Iran
Halat, Lebanon, a village in Byblos District, Mount Lebanon Governorate, Lebanon